Iryna Khokhlova is a Ukrainian (until 2014) and Argentine (since 2014) modern pentathlete. Khokhlova was born on 29 January 1990.

Career
At the 2012 Summer Olympics, she competed in the women's competition, finishing in 10th place.

She moved to Argentina in 2014. In 2014, she married pentathlete Emmanuel Zapata from Argentina.

She competed for Argentina in the World Cup Series #2 in Cairo in 2015 and at the 2016 Summer Olympics, finishing in 27th place.

References

External links
 
 

1990 births
Living people
Ukrainian female modern pentathletes
Olympic modern pentathletes of Ukraine
Modern pentathletes at the 2012 Summer Olympics
Ukrainian emigrants to Argentina
Naturalized citizens of Argentina
Ukrainian expatriates in Argentina
World Modern Pentathlon Championships medalists
Argentine female modern pentathletes
South American Games gold medalists for Argentina
South American Games medalists in modern pentathlon
Modern pentathletes at the 2016 Summer Olympics
Olympic modern pentathletes of Argentina
Competitors at the 2018 South American Games
Sportspeople from Donetsk Oblast